The Yugoslav Republican Party, was a party in the Kingdom of Serbs, Croats and Slovenes active between 1920 and 1929. Founded by a group of Liberal intellectuals as the Republican Democratic Party (Републиканска демократска странка) on 21 January 1920, it changed name on the congress held on 27 January 1921. It supported federalization of the state. The leader was Ljubomir Stojanović. In the 1920 Constitutional Assembly elections it received 18,136 votes (1.1%) and 3 seats; in the 1923 parliamentary election it received 18,941 (0.9%) and lost its seats, never managing to win seats in the 1925 and 1927 elections. It was dissolved after the 6 January Dictatorship (1929).

Election results

References

Sources

Political parties in the Kingdom of Yugoslavia
Political parties established in 1920
Political parties disestablished in 1929
Defunct liberal political parties
Liberalism in Yugoslavia